Nicolás Jarry was the defending champion but lost in the final to Emilio Gómez.

Gómez won the title after defeating Jarry 4–6, 7–6(8–6), 6–4 in the final.

Seeds

Draw

Finals

Top half

Bottom half

References

External links
Main draw
Qualifying draw

Salinas Challenger II - 1